Spodnja Brežnica is a settlement in the Municipality of Poljčane in northeastern Slovenia. It lies north of Poljčane on the regional road to Slovenska Bistrica. The railway line from Ljubljana to Maribor runs through the settlement. The area is part of the traditional region of Styria. It is now included with the rest of the municipality in the Drava Statistical Region.

References

External links
 
Spodnja Brežnica on Geopedia

Populated places in the Municipality of Poljčane